Kirloskar Pneumatic Company Limited (KPCL) is one of the core Kirloskar Group companies and was founded in 1958 by Shantanurao Laxmanrao Kirloskar. The company offers engineering products and is represented by offices across the globe. KPCL serves major sectors like Oil and Gas, Steel, Cement, Food and Beverage, Railways, Defense and Marine. Their product range includes air compressors, air conditioning and refrigeration systems, process gas systems, vapour absorption chillers and industrial gearboxes.

History
Kirloskar Brothers Limited was founded in 1888 by Mr L. K. Kirloskar, the Kirloskar Group is one of India's oldest, multi-product, multi-location, diversified engineering conglomerate with annual sales exceeding $2.5 billion. It gave India its first iron plough, water pump, diesel engine and machine tool.. The compressor business was divested from Kirloskar Brothers Limited to form Kirloskar Pneumatic Company Limited (KPCL) in 1958.

The Kirloskar group of companies was one of the earliest industrial groups in the engineering industry in India. The group produces pumps, engines, compressors, lathes and electrical equipment like motors, transformers and generators (it is the world's largest genset manufacturer). Laxmanrao Kirloskar established the group, after which his son S. L. Kirloskar became its head.

Businesses

KPCL has four strategic business units, Air Compressor Division (ACD), Air Conditioning and Refrigeration division (ACR), Process Gas Systems division (PGS) and Transmission division (TRM).

Air Compressor Division (ACD)

ACD is engaged in the design, manufacture, supply and erection/commissioning of a wide range of air and gas compressors. This encompasses the reciprocating and rotary (screw and centrifugal) compressors for industrial segments and defense. KPCL offers air compressors from 30 to 10,000 CFM.

Air Conditioning and Refrigeration division (ACR)

ACR division offers  Reciprocating Open-Type Compressors (Cold Chain applications), Process Refrigeration Systems (Refinery and Petrochemicals, Chemicals, Fertilizers and Marine) and Vapour Absorption Chillers (Process Cooling and Air Conditioning). ACR Equipment range from 50 to 500 TR, Vapor absorption chillers from 90 to 500 TR and Refrigeration Systems up to 800 TR.

Process Gas Systems division (PGS)

PGS provides turnkey solutions for Gas Compression Systems in the Oil and Gas Sectors. It also undertakes Operation and Maintenance contracts for Compressed Natural Gas (CNG) and American Petroleum Institute (API) Gas Compression packages. KPCL offers CNG packages with Suction Pressure (0.5 to 65 bar) and Gas Flow (300 to 3,500 SCMH). API Gas Compression packages range from 50 CFM to 6000 CFM.

Transmission division (TRM)

TRM is engaged in the design, manufacture and supply of traction gears, railway transmissions and customized gearboxes for wind turbines, and industrial applications. TRM also offers refurbishment of industrial gearboxes of select applications. The wind turbine gearbox range is up to 2.5 MW and industrial gearbox is up to 16 MW.

Manufacturing facilities
Kirloskar Pneumatic Company Limited (KPCL) has three manufacturing units and a nationwide network of sales offices, with its headquarters in Pune.

Pune

The Pune-based unit has manufacturing and sales for the air compressor and transmission business units.

Saswad

The Saswad plant manufactures air conditioning, refrigeration, process gas systems and CNG packages.

Subsidiaries and associate companies
Kirloskar Chillers Private Limited, Pune (KCPL)

References

Manufacturing companies established in 1958
Engineering companies of India
Manufacturing companies based in Pune
1958 establishments in Bombay State
Indian companies established in 1958